The 1894–95 season was Swindon Town's first season in the Southern League, the club's first season within a league structure. Swindon also competed in the FA Cup.

League table

Results

Southern League Division One

Test Match

FA Cup

Appearances and goals

|-
|}

Matchday squads

Southern League Division One line-ups

Test Match line-ups

FA Cup line-ups

External links
Extensive Swindon Town statistics site

1894-95
Swindon Town